Chelonodon is a genus of pufferfishes native to the Indo-Pacific. They are mainly found in coastal regions and estuaries, but sometimes in rivers.

Species and taxonomy
There are five recognized species in this genus:

 Chelonodon bengalensis (Habib et al., 2018)
 Chelonodon dapsilis Whitley, 1943 (plentiful toby)
 Chelonodon laticeps J. L. B. Smith, 1948 (blue-spotted blaasop)
 Chelonodon patoca  (F. Hamilton, 1822) (milk-spotted puffer)
 Chelonodon pleurospilus (Regan, 1919) (blaasop beauty)

The type species of Chelonodon is Leiodon cutcutia, making the genus name a synonym. As a consequence, Catalog of Fishes and other authorities instead place the above five species in Chelonodontops. FishBase, however, still uses Chelonodon.

References

Tetraodontidae
Ray-finned fish genera
Taxa named by Johannes Peter Müller